The Danish Union of Architects is a trade union in Denmark. It has a membership of 4,500 and is affiliated with the Danish Confederation of Professional Associations.

External links
 Official website

Akademikerne – The Danish Confederation of Professional Associations
Trade unions in Denmark